An institutional investor is an entity which pools money to purchase securities, real property, and other investment assets or originate loans. Institutional investors include commercial banks, central banks, credit unions, government-linked companies, insurers, pension funds, sovereign wealth funds, charities, hedge funds, REITs, investment advisors, endowments, and mutual funds. Operating companies which invest excess capital in these types of assets may also be included in the term. Activist institutional investors may also influence corporate governance by exercising voting rights in their investments. In 2019, the world's top 500 asset managers collectively managed $104.4 trillion in Assets under Management (AuM).

Although institutional investors appear to be more sophisticated than retail investors, it remains unclear if professional active investment managers can reliably enhance risk-adjusted returns by an amount that exceeds fees and expenses of investment management, due to issues with limiting agency costs. Lending credence to doubts about active investors' ability to 'beat the market', passive index funds have gained traction with the rise of passive investors: the three biggest US asset managers together owned an average of 18% in the S&P 500 Index and together constituted the largest shareholder in 88% of the S&P 500 by 2015. The potential of institutional investors in infrastructure markets is increasingly noted after financial crises in the early twenty-first century.

History

Ancient Rome and Islam

Roman law ignored the concept of juristic person, yet at the time the practice of private evergetism (which dates to, at least, the 4th century BC in Greece) sometimes led to the creation of revenues-producing capital which may be interpreted as an early form of charitable institution. In some African colonies in particular, part of the city's entertainment was financed by the revenue generated by shops and baking-ovens originally offered by a wealthy benefactor. In the South of Gaul, aqueducts were sometimes financed in a similar fashion.

The legal principle of juristic person might have appeared with the rise of monasteries in the early centuries of Christianity. The concept then might have been adopted by the emerging Islamic law. The waqf (charitable institution) became a cornerstone of the financing of education, waterworks, welfare and even the construction of monuments.
Alongside some Christian monasteries the waqfs created in the 10th century AD are amongst the longest standing charities in the world (see for instance the Imam Reza shrine).

Pre-industrial Europe
Following the spread of monasteries, almshouses and other hospitals, donating sometimes large sums of money to institutions became a common practice in medieval Western Europe. In the process, over the centuries those institutions acquired sizable estates and large fortunes in bullion. Following the collapse of the agrarian revenues, many of these institutions moved away from rural real estate to concentrate on bonds emitted by the local sovereign (the shift dates back to the 15th century for Venice, and the 17th century for France and the Dutch Republic). The importance of lay and religious institutional ownership in the pre-industrial European economy cannot be overstated, they commonly possessed 10 to 30% of a given region arable land.

In the 18th century, private investors pool their resources to pursue lottery tickets and tontine shares allowing them to spread risk and become some of the earliest speculative institutions known in the West.

Before 1980
Following several waves of dissolution (mostly during the Reformation and the Revolutionary period) the weight of the traditional charities in the economy collapsed; by 1800, institutions solely owned 2% of the arable land in England and Wales. New types of institutions emerged (banks, insurance companies), yet despite some success stories, they failed to attract a large share of the public's savings and, for instance, by 1950, they owned 48% of US equities and certainly even less in other countries.

Overview

Because of their sophistication, institutional investors may be exempt from certain securities laws.  For example, in the United States, institutional investors are generally eligible to purchase private placements under Rule 506 of Regulation D as "accredited investors". Further, large US institutional investors may qualify to purchase certain securities generally restricted from retail investment under Rule 144A.

In Canada, companies selling to accredited investors can be exempted from regulatory reporting by each of the provincial Canadian Securities Administrators.

Institutional investors as financial intermediaries
As intermediaries between individual investors and companies, institutional investors are important sources of capital in financial markets. By pooling constituents' investments, institutional investors arguably reduce the cost of capital for entrepreneurs while diversifying constituents' portfolios. Their greater ability to influence corporate behaviour as well to select investors profiles may help diminish agency costs.

Life cycle
Institutional investors investment horizons' differ, but do not share the same life cycle as human beings. Unlike individuals, they do not have a phase of accumulation (active work life) followed by one of consumption (retirement), and they do not die.  Here insurance companies differ from the rest of the institutional investors; as they cannot guess when they will have to repay their clients. Therefore, they need highly liquid assets which reduces their investment opportunities. Others like pension funds can predict long ahead when they will have to repay their investors allowing them to invest in less liquid assets such as private equities, hedge funds or commodities. Finally, other institutions have an extended investment horizon, allowing them to invest in illiquid assets as they are unlikely to be forced to sell them before term.

Institutional-investor types

 Asset manager
 Bank
 Endowment fund
 Foundation
 Hedge fund
 Insurance company
 Investment company
 Investment trust
 Mutual fund
 Pension fund
 Sovereign wealth fund
 Unit trust and unit investment trust
 Family offices

Regional
In various countries different types of institutional investors may be more important.  In oil-exporting countries sovereign wealth funds are very important, while in developed countries, pension funds may be more important.

Canada
Some examples of important Canadian institutional investors are:
 Canada Pension Plan Investment Board (C$420.4 billion [2019])
 Caisse de dépôt et placement du Québec (C$340.1 billion [2019])
 Ontario Teachers' Pension Plan (C$207.4 billion [2019])
 British Columbia Investment Management Corporation (C$153.4 billion [2019])
OMERS Ontario Municipal Employees Retirement System((C$105 billion)
 Healthcare of Ontario Pension Plan ((C$100 billion)
 Alberta Investment Management (C$118.8 billion [2019])
 Labourers Pension Fund of Central and Eastern Canada (C$8 billion)
 College of Applied Arts and Technology Pension Plan (C$13.5 billion)
 OPSEU Pension Trust (C$22 billion)
 Canadian Pacific Railway (C$14.3 billion)
 Canadian National Railway (C$19.4 billion)

China
China's program to allow institutional investors to invest in its capital market is called Qualified Foreign Institutional Investor (QWFII).

India
In India, the term Foreign Institutional Investor (FII) is used to refer to foreign companies investing in India's capital markets. 

Recently FIIs have invested a total of $23 billion in the Indian market under this. With this, Foreign-exchange reserves of India have reached a total of $584 billion and it has become a new record in the Indian market. 

Also called Foreign direct investment or FDI, statutory agencies in India like SEBI have prescribed norms to register FIIs and also to regulate such investments flowing in through FIIs. In 2008, FIIs represented the largest institution investment category, with an estimated US$ 751.14 billion.

Japan
Japan is home to the world's largest pension fund (GPI) and is home to 63 of the top 300 pension funds worldwide (by Assets Under Management).  These include:
 Government Pension Investment Fund ($1045.5 billion [2011])
 Local Government Officials ($165 billion [2004])
 Pension Fund Association ($117 billion [2004])

United Kingdom
In the UK, institutional investors may play a major role in economic affairs, and are highly concentrated in the City of London's square mile. Their wealth accounts for around two-thirds of the equity in public listed companies. For any given company, the largest 25 investors would have to be able to muster over half of the votes.

United States
Some examples of important U.S. institutional investors are:
 Alaska Permanent Fund ($73 billion [2021])
 Ensign Peak Advisors ($100 billion [2019])
 CalPERS ($389 billion [2020])
 CalSTRS ($282 billion [2021])
 Harvard University endowment ($42 billion [2020])
 New York State Common Retirement ($248 billion [2020])
 Princeton University endowment ($27 billion [2020])
 Stanford University endowment ($30 billion [2020])
 Teacher Retirement System of Texas ($165 billion [2020])
 Yale University endowment ($31 billion [2020])

The major investor associations are:
Investment Management Association
Association of British Insurers
National Association of Pension Funds
The Association of Investment Trust Companies

The IMA, ABI, NAPF, and AITC, plus the British Merchant Banking and Securities House Association were also represented by the Institutional Shareholder Committee (ISC). As of August 2014 the ISC effectively became the Institutional Investors Committee (IIC), which comprises the Association of British Insurers, the Investment Management Association and the National Association of Pension Funds.

See also

Global assets under management
Investment management
List of institutional investors in the United Kingdom
Private placement

Notes

References

Articles
AA Berle, "Property, Production and Revolution" (1965) 65 Columbia Law Review 1
 LW Beeferman, "Pension Fund Investment in Infrastructure: A Resource Paper", Capital Matter (Occasional Paper Series), No.3 December 2008
BS Black and JC Coffee, "Hail Britannia?: Institutional Investor Behavior under Limited Regulation" (1994) 92(7) Michigan Law Review 1997
G Clark and A Clark, "Common Rights to Land in England, 1475–1839" (2001) 61(4) The Journal of Economic History 1009
JC Coffee, "Liquidity versus Control: The Institutional Investor as Corporate Monitor" (1991) 91 Columbia Law Review 1277–1368
BL Connelly, R Hoskisson, L Tihanyi & ST Certo, "Ownership as a Form of Corporate Governance" (2010) Journal of Management Studies, Vol 47(8):1561-1589.
PL Davies, "Institutional investors in the United Kingdom" in T Baums et al., Institutional Investors and Corporate Governance (Walter de Gruyter 1994) ch 9
 MN Firzli & V Bazi, "Infrastructure Investments in an Age of Austerity : The Pension and Sovereign Funds Perspective", USAK/JTW 30 July 2011 and Revue Analyse Financière, Q4 2011
KU Schmolke, "Institutional Investors' Mandatory Voting Disclosure: The Proposal of the European Commission against the Background of the US Experience" (2006) EBOLR 767

Books
A Chandler, The Visible Hand (1977)
PL Davis et al., Institutional Investors (MIT Press 2001)
MC Jensen (ed), Studies in the Theory of Capital Markets (F. Praeger 1972)
Jae Myong Koh, Green Infrastructure Financing: Institutional Investors, PPPs and Bankable Projects (Palgrave Macmillan, 2018)
GP Stapledon, Institutional Shareholders and Corporate Governance (Oxford 1996)

External links
Institutional Investor Magazine

 
Investment